Jonas Matheus (born 29 July 1986) is a Namibian boxer. He began boxing in 2010 and competed at the 2012 Summer Olympics as a bantamweight boxer, where he was defeated by Italian Vittorio Parrinello.

References

1986 births
Living people
Olympic boxers of Namibia
Bantamweight boxers
Boxers at the 2012 Summer Olympics
Namibian male boxers